Belluzzi is a surname of Italian origin. Notable people with this surname include:

 Andrea Belluzzi (born 1968), Sammarinese politician, as a Captain Regent with Roberto Venturini
 Antonio Belluzzi (or Bellucci; 1654–1726), Italian soldier and then painter of the Rococo period 
 Bernardino Belluzzi (1642–1719), Roman Catholic Bishop of Camerino and later of Montefeltro
 Giovanni Battista Belluzzi (1506–1554), also known as Il Sanmarino, Sammarinese architect
 Lodovico Belluzzi, Captain Regent of San Marino with Francesco Guidi Giangi
 Odone Belluzzi (1899–1956), Italian engineer

See also 
 Bellucci
 Bellizzi (surname)